Jean Daviot (born February 20, 1962) is a French contemporary artist born in Digne. He went to the art school at the Villa Arson in Nice and lives and works in Paris.

Work 
Jean Daviot distinguishes himself by the exploitation of various ways of intervention: video, photography, painting, but also actions in the landscape or sonorous works. In 1984, he created a fictional character: the artist Walter Pinkrops. From 1994, he realised "Ombrographies" by taking imprints of faces and hands in photocopy and transferring these traces onto white canvas. Since 1999, he has drawn the outline of people coming to his workshop: "The visitors of the self". In these paintings, the body and its shadow join in the same shape: "The shape of the body is the body of the shape". In "Silences", he questions the language of the hands: a universal language of symbols. In "Srevne", presented at "La force de l'art" in 2006 in the Grand Palais in Paris, he made his voice heard at the place, inside out and upside down backwards. He sculpts the language as an object, which then becomes an off-voice reflection of the palimpsest. "L'écart des mots" are photographs where he inserts words in landscapes, skies, cities, playing on their signifieds and signifiers. With "Vherbe" he really makes words grow in the landscape, words in letters of grass which can measure several hundred meters: "MEmoiRE" near the prehistoric cave of Pech Merle, "ImaGinE"  at the Genshagen Foundation in Berlin, or "Lieu et lien" in front of the Palais du Pharo in Marseille.

Since 1995, Jean Daviot gas created digital paintings, "Ecritures de lumières", where he uses a video camera as a brush. The procedure is simple, in appearance: the camera slows down, he heads it towards planets emitting or reflecting light, the Sun, Venus, Jupiter, the Toon, or towards cities at night and lets, by the movement of his hand, the light deposit itself on the support. It is the very light which deposits itself in bursts of colour, streams of oscillations and of flow on the screen, the canvas, the wall. A work that Marc-Alain Ouaknin calls "The sky at his fingertips", the title of a book he wrote on the artist. In his "Bocca del mondo", Daviot makes huge jars speak and discuss; by night they transform into planets. In a work in 2013, "en visage le paysage", points of view on places appear through the contour of his face made of stone or metal. In 2016, Daviot continued his "Wordscapes" around the language and writes words in landscapes in a new form of Land art.

Recent exhibitions (selection) 
2006
 La Force de l'art, Grand Palais, Paris
 Distorsions, Institut d'art contemporain, Villeurbanne
 L'Homme-Paysage, Palais des beaux-arts de Lille
2007
 Transformationen, Entgrenzungen, Körperräume Villa Oppenheim, Berlin 
 L'Homme-Paysage, Château d'Oiron
 MEmoiRE, Nuit Blanche, Church of Saint-Sulpice, Paris, Paris
 Propos d'Europe 0.6, Hippocrène Foundation, Agence Mallet-Stevens, Paris
 Écriture de lumières, Vidéo K.01, Centre d'art contemporain Le Parvis, Pau
 Bocca del mondo, La loggia Montefiridolfi, Florence, Italy
2008
 Journées mondiale de la philosophie, UNESCO, Insistance, Paris
 Paris/Budapest, château de Fehérvárcsurgó, Hungary
 Boomerang, Maison des arts Georges Pompidou, Cajarc / Maison Daura, Saint-Cirq-Lapopie / Centre de Préhistoire de Pech Merle
 ...Einen augen-blick, bitte Kunstverein-Bad-Salzdetfurth e.V., Bodenburg, Germany 
 Mujeres Museo Shcp-Hacienda, Mexico
2009
 Materialität der Sprache, KunstbüroBerlin, Berlin
 Dreamtime, les Abattoirs, Musée d'art moderne et contemporain, Toulouse
 Ecriture de lune dans la grotte du Mas-d'Azil, Ariège
 ImaGinE, Domaine de Saint-Jean de Beauregard, Essonne
2010
  Fondation Genshagen, Berlin
  Vie si on, Centre d'art contemporain, Saint-Restitut
2011
 Lieu/Lien, Palais du Pharo, Marseille
 Bocca del mondo, festival a part, Château royal, Tarascon
2012
 The Hidden Mother, atelier Rouart/Berthe Morisot, Paris
 La plasticité du langage, Hippocrène Foundation, Agence Mallet-Stevens, Paris
 Ecriture de lumières, Mathieu Muséum, Gargas
 Mot d'elle/ Modèle, Parc de Maison-Blanche, Marseille
2013
 Avenir, Genshagen Foundation, Berlin
 Galaxie de Lalangue, Ile de Porquerolles
 L'art au défi de l'espérance, Mairie de Paris
2014
 Lux, Le Fresnoy, Studio national des arts contemporains, Tourcoing
 l'île envisagée, Pierre Salinger Foundation, Le Thor
2017
Svet lo, Kutscherfeld Palace, French Institute of Slovakia, Bratislava

Monographs 
 Evelyne Toussaint, Jean Daviot, Nowmuseum, 2016
 Marc-Alain Ouaknin, Le ciel au bout des doigts, Paris Musées /Actes Sud, 2004
 Philippe Lançon, Jean Daviot, Victoire Éditions, Paris, 1998
 Nathalie Ergino, Hall, Paris, 1996

References

External links 
 Official website of Jean Daviot 
 http://www.documentsdartistes.org/artistes/daviot 

1962 births
Living people
People from Digne-les-Bains
French contemporary artists